Andrzej Jerzy Zakrzewski (22 August 1941, in Warsaw – 10 February 2000, in Warsaw) was a Polish lawyer, historian, politician, journalist, and publicist. He was a member of the Conservative People's Party (Stronnictwo Konserwatywno-Ludowe), the Solidarity Electoral Action (Akcja Wyborcza Solidarność), and Minister of Culture and National Heritage of the Republic of Poland in cabinet of Jerzy Buzek (1999–2000).

References

Writers from Warsaw
Lawyers from Warsaw
Politicians from Warsaw
1941 births
2000 deaths
Government ministers of Poland
20th-century Polish historians
Polish male non-fiction writers
Polish publicists
Solidarity Electoral Action politicians
20th-century Polish lawyers
20th-century Polish journalists